Joseph William Saumarez Smith (born 29 September 1971) is a British businessman, journalist and gambling expert. He is Chair of the British Horseracing Authority, the chief executive of Sports Gaming Ltd, a gambling management consultancy, chairman of gambling platform developer Bede Gaming and an investor in numerous online businesses.

Early life
Joseph Saumarez Smith was born on 29 September 1971 in London, England. His paternal great-great-grandfather, William Saumarez Smith, was the Archbishop of Sydney in the 19th century. His father is John Saumarez Smith, the London-based bookseller, and his mother is Laura. He has a brother, the neo-classical architect George Saumarez Smith.

Saumarez Smith was educated at Winchester College and then at Bristol University, where he gained a first in politics and edited Epigram, the university newspaper. He has an MBA in Management, Strategy and Marketing from the Wharton School of the University of Pennsylvania where he was the recipient of a Thouron Award and also studied at London Business School as part of Wharton's International Exchange Programme.

Career

Journalism
After university he worked at South West News Service, the Bristol-based press agency, and The Sunday Telegraph, as a general news reporter. In 1995 he was appointed education correspondent of The Sunday Telegraph and was subsequently made transport and industry correspondent. In 1996 he moved to Express Newspapers as education editor of The Daily Express and The Sunday Express. In 1997 he was appointed deputy political editor of The Sunday Express, working alongside Peter Oborne, Simon Walters and Richard Addis. He left The Sunday Express in 1999 to study for an MBA.

Saumarez Smith has written for a large number of newspapers and magazines and is a regular broadcaster, mainly about gambling. He has had regular columns in The Financial Times (about his time at Wharton Business School), Bloomberg and the British Airways in flight magazine High Life. He has also written for The Times, The Daily Telegraph, The Age, Sunday Business, The Racing Post and The European. He has appeared on numerous radio and television programmes, including on Al Jazeera, BBC Radio 4's Today programme and Sky News.

He wrote a chapter in the Daily Telegraph Chronicle of Horse Racing about gambling.

Gambling
Saumarez Smith started gambling at the age of eight when Mike Fitzmaurice, a maths master at his preparatory school, started teaching fractions using betting odds. He attended his first race meeting at the age of 12 at Sandown Park, where he opened his first credit account with rails bookmakers Heathorns.

In 2001 he founded Sports Gaming, a management consultancy to the gaming industry. He has worked as a consultant to many of Europe and Asia's leading gambling companies and has advised on several major M&A transactions in the online gambling industry. He was founder of BetUK.com, which was sold to Canadian private equity investors in 2007. Sports Gaming is the publisher of numerous gambling information sites, including BetAsia.com and IndiaBet.com. He is chairman of Bede Gaming, a developer of gaming platforms used by online and land based gaming operators.

In June 2003 he acquired Vegas Insider, the leading gambling information site in the United States. He sold the site to American investors in 2007.

Saumarez Smith is credited with inventing the gambling term Asian handicap.

Horseracing
Saumarez Smith has been a lifelong follower of horseracing and has visited more than 200 racetracks worldwide. He was on the 1991 Jockey Club Graduate Programme and was placed at the Racing Post where he wrote news articles and Spotlight form commentaries. In December 2014 he was appointed a non executive director of the British Horseracing Authority, the regulator of UK horseracing. In March 2022 it was announced that he would take over from Annamarie Phelps as Chair of the British Horseracing Authority  and in December 2022 it was announced that his term has been extended by racing's shareholders until 2025. He has shares in several horses which are trained by Martin Keighley. He has previously had horses in training with Henry Candy, Ed Dunlop, Kris Lees, Ed Walker, Ilka Gansera-Leveque, David Pipe, Ali Stronge and Archie Alexander in Australia.

Business interests
Saumarez Smith was the co-founder and chief executive of Schoolsnet, an online education company, from 1999 to 2001. Schoolsnet was sold in September 2003 to Hotcourses, the education company founded by British politician Jeremy Hunt.

Saumarez Smith is an investor in numerous Internet start ups. Successful investments include the sale of IPS to Leo Vegas in February 2018 for £65 million, the sale of luxury cycle clothing company Rapha to RZC Investments for £200 million in August 2017 and the sale of a majority stake in Bede Gaming to Gauselmann Group in March 2020. His  investments include graduate recruitment company TalentPool, online funeral resource Funeral Zone, ceramic antenna developer Helix Technologies, lingerie company Bluebella, geo-location software Crowdconnected, insurance tech company Sherpa, online games studio Playzido and online games kit developer Black Cow Technology. He has a significant stake in Suffolk brewers Adnams plc.

Accomplishments
Saumarez Smith was named Commodore/Sunday Times Young Computer Brain of the Year 1985. He was named one of Management Today's Young Meteors in November 2000.

He finished as runner up in the 1994 World Series of Poker media event and was introduced the next year as the "reigning champion" as the actual winner, Bill "Bulldog" Sykes had died in the meantime. Saumarez Smith completed the 2011 Etape du Tour Act I cycling race from Modane to Alpe d'Huez in 4,158th place., the 2014 La Marmotte cycling race in 4,133rd place and the 2015 Maratona dles Dolomites in 3,878th place.

He has been a Patron of the Ben Kinsella Trust since September 2018.

References

1971 births
Living people
Writers from London
English male journalists
Poker players from London
People educated at Winchester College
Alumni of the University of Bristol
English male non-fiction writers